The Marxist Workers League is a Trotskyist organization in Finland.

It was previously affiliated with the Committee For a Workers' International, it is now affiliated with the Coordinating Committee for the Refoundation of the Fourth International.

References

External links
Group website

Communist parties in Finland
Coordinating Committee for the Refoundation of the Fourth International
Non-registered political parties in Finland
Political parties with year of establishment missing
Trotskyist organizations in Europe